is an underground metro station located in Chikusa-ku, Nagoya, Aichi Prefecture, Japan operated by the Nagoya Municipal Subway's Higashiyama Line. It is located 12.6 rail kilometers from the terminus of the Higashiyama Line at Takabata Station. Nearby is the Furukawa Art Museum.

History
Ikeshita Station was opened on 15 June 1960. The wicket gates were automated to use the Manaca smart card system from 11 February 2011.

Lines

 (Station number: H14)

Layout
Ikeshita Station has two underground opposed side platforms.

Platforms

External links
 Ikeshita Station official web site

References

Railway stations in Japan opened in 1960
Railway stations in Aichi Prefecture